Cristián Alberto Castañeda Vargas (born 18 September 1968) is a retired Chilean football player. He played for a few clubs, including Universidad de Chile and Everton Viña del Mar, his last club was Deportes Arica.

Nicknamed "Scooby" Castañeda played for the Chile national football team and was a participant at the 1998 FIFA World Cup. He was capped 25 times scoring 1 goal between 1994 and 1998, and made his debut on 1994-03-26.

Personal life
He also played alongside his older brother, Víctor Hugo, for Palestino, Universidad de Chile and the Chile national team. In addition, his cousins Marco and Roly were with the Palestino youth ranks, as well as his uncle Manuel, who was with the reserve team.

Honours

Club
Universidad de Chile
 Primera División de Chile (4): 1994, 1995, 1999, 2000
 Copa Chile (2): 1998, 2000

Everton
 Primera B (1): 2003

References

1968 births
Living people
People from Cachapoal Province
Chilean footballers
Chile international footballers
General Velásquez footballers
Club Deportivo Palestino footballers
Universidad de Chile footballers
Everton de Viña del Mar footballers
San Marcos de Arica footballers
Deportes Copiapó managers
Primera B de Chile players
Chilean Primera División players
1998 FIFA World Cup players
1995 Copa América players
Association football fullbacks
Chilean football managers
Curicó Unido managers
Primera B de Chile managers